Jesse O'Brien may refer to:

Jesse O'Brien (footballer) (born 1990), Australian rules football player
Jesse O'Brien, contestant with season 2 of New Zealand Idol
Jesse O'Brien, Australian film director of Arrowhead and Two Heads Creek